Jo Sidhu KC (Punjabi: ਜੋ ਸਿਧੁ) (born in 1966 in Southall, London) is a British criminal law barrister and King's Counsel.

Career 
Sidhu has worked as a criminal law barrister since 1993.

He is chairman of the Criminal Bar Association.

He was the chairperson for the Society of Asian lawyers, the biggest BAME lawyers’ society in the UK representing over 3,000 members and since 2001 he has been the Vice chair of the Equality & Diversity Committee of the Bar Council.

In 2012 Sidhu was appointed Queen's Counsel a rank awarded to about 8% of practising barristers. He is one of about 100 BAME QCs in Britain of whom few have Punjabi origin.

Like other successful criminal practitioners, Sidhu specialises in serious crime, typically terrorism, homicides and conspiracies involving frauds, robberies and drug trafficking. He was a target of death threats and online harassment lasting 12 months in 2015. After police were unable to provide assistance due to a lack of resources, Sidhu hired a forensic computer expert to track the cyber-criminal behind the smear campaign, who was then jailed for five years.

Sidhu has said that the government must do more to tackle cyber threats of this nature.

Awards and recognition 
In 2016, Sidhu was awarded the UK's Asian Professional of the Year Award 2016. 

21st-century King's Counsel
English people of South Asian descent
1966 births
Living people